Buckland Newton is a village and civil parish in Dorset, England. In the 2011 census the civil parish had a population of 622. The village covers around 6000 acres.

The village lies within the Buckland Newton Hundred. Amenities in the village include a pub (The Gaggle of Geese), shop, primary school and village hall.

Approximately three quarters of the parish lies within the Dorset Area of Outstanding Natural Beauty.

History
The name 'Buckland' derives from bōc-land, Old English for 'charter land' or land with special privileges created by royal diploma, while 'Newton' is a more recent addition taken from Sturminster Newton, a nearby town.

Evidence for prehistoric settlement comes from Bronze Age barrows at Gales Hill and the Iron Age hill fort of Dungeon Hill.

The parish originally had five settlements, each with their own open field system: Buckland Newton, Brockhampton, Duntish, Henley (perhaps previously known as Knoll) and Minterne Parva, the last now part of Minterne Magna parish. Farms based on small mediaeval enclosures include Chaston Farm, Revels Farm, and possibly Bookham.

Although the Parish Church of the Holy Rood was restored in the 19th century, it has a 13th-century chancel and 15th-century nave, west tower and aisles, plus fragments of 12th-century sculpture which are evidence of an earlier structure. In 1980 the writer and literary director Roland Gant described Holy Rood as "a lovely church", but that the first impression it created was not favourable due to its exterior having been rendered in cement, "giving the Perpendicular square tower the look of a Foreign Legion fort".  The church has six bells, the oldest having been cast around 1380.

It was demolished in 1965.

Geography
Prominent nearby hills at the top of the escarpment to the southeast include the  Ball Hill and the  Lyscombe Hill near the Dorsetshire Gap.

The River Lydden rises in the numerous springs round the village, principally Buckland Bottom and Bladeley Bottom 

There are 11 locally recognised Sites of Nature Conservation Interest within or close to the parish, as well as areas of Ancient Woodland. The main habitat types for sites of wildlife interest are deciduous woodland and calcareous grassland (the latter is particularly significant for butterflies). There is also a small area of lowland meadows within Buckland Newton Itself.

References

External links 

Buckland Newton Community
Buckland Newton Online Parish Clerk (OPC) page

Villages in Dorset